Aïn Kerma  is a town and commune in El Taref Province, Algeria. According to the 1998 census, it has a population of 12,182.

Frantz Fanon is buried here.

References

Communes of El Taref Province